Jordan Canning is a Canadian director for film and television. She is known for her independent feature films We Were Wolves (2014) and Suck It Up (2017), as well as her work directing on television series Baroness Von Sketch Show, Burden of Truth and Schitt's Creek.

Early life
She was born in St. John's, Newfoundland and Labrador. She attended Concordia University in Montreal.

Career
Canning's films have won a number of awards, including two Golden Sheaf Awards, three awards at the NSI Online Short Film Festival, and top prize at the 2012 Toronto International Film Festival RBC Emerging Filmmaker Competition. She directed all twenty-three episodes of the IPF-supported web series Space Riders: Division Earth for CTV. The show won the 2014 Canadian Screen Award for Best Digital Series and four Canadian Comedy Awards, including Best Director.

Canning's 2014 feature film We Were Wolves screened at the Toronto Film Festival and is distributed by Unobstructed View.

In 2015, Canning was awarded the Women In the Director's Chair Feature Film Award for her second feature film, Suck It Up (2017), which premiered at the 2017 Slamdance Film Festival and is distributed by Level Film. The film won Best Feature Film at the 2017 B3 Frankfurt Biennale, and Canning was nominated for the Directors Guild of Canada's DGC Discovery Award.

In 2016, Canning made her foray into television, directing on Saving Hope and This Hour Has 22 Minutes, where she became the first female director on the show. The following year she directed episodes of the series The Detail (CTV), Burden of Truth (CBC/The CW), and Baroness Von Sketch Show (CBC/IFC). In 2018, she directed on Schitt's Creek, Little Dog (CBC) and Baroness Von Sketch Show season four.

Canning was nominated for two 2020 Canadian Screen Awards: one for Best Direction, Comedy  (Schitt’s Creek, Meet The Parents) and one for Best Direction, Variety or Sketch Comedy (Baroness Von Sketch Show, Humanity is in An Awkward Stage - with co-director Aleysa Young).

Canning also directed a number of music videos, including
 Death is Quick by Hey Rosetta!
 There's an Arc by Hey Rosetta
 Best Served by Pathological Lovers
 All Hands by Tim Baker
 Dance by Tim Baker

She is a 2010 graduate of the Director's Lab at the Canadian Film Centre and an alumnus of TIFF Pitch This! and Talent Lab.

Filmography

Film

Television

References

External links 
 Get Set Films - Official website
 

Living people
Canadian women film directors
Canadian women television directors
Film directors from Newfoundland and Labrador
People from St. John's, Newfoundland and Labrador
Canadian Screen Award winners
Canadian television directors
Canadian Film Centre alumni
Year of birth missing (living people)
Canadian Comedy Award winners